Yaqoub Yousef Matouq Mohamed Al Hosani (Arabic:يعقوب الحوسني) (born 1 June 1987) is an Emirati footballer. He currently plays  as a midfielder.

External links

References

Emirati footballers
1987 births
Living people
Al Dhafra FC players
Al Wahda FC players
Al Ain FC players
Al Jazira Club players
Al-Ittihad Kalba SC players
Al-Arabi SC (UAE) players
Place of birth missing (living people)
UAE First Division League players
UAE Pro League players
Association football midfielders